Moneilema subrugosum is a species of beetle in the family Cerambycidae. It was described by Bland in 1862.

References

Moneilemini
Beetles described in 1862